House of the People can refer to:
 House of the People (Afghanistan), the lower house of the National Assembly of Afghanistan
 Lok Sabha ("House of the People"), the lower house of the Parliament of India
 Palace of the Parliament ("House of the People"), the meeting place of the Parliament of Romania
 House of the People (Somalia), the lower house of the Federal Parliament of Somalia
 House of Representatives, the lower house of the Congress of the Philippines
 Maison du Peuple (Brussels) ("House of the People"), a former building in Belgium
 Maison du Peuple (Clichy), a national heritage site in Clichy, France
 House of the People, the lower house of the old Federal Assembly of Czechoslovakia

See also
 Casa Pueblo (disambiguation)
 Council of States (disambiguation)
 The People's House (disambiguation)